Bear Creek Cumberland Presbyterian Church, also known as Bear Creek Community Church, is a historic church in an isolated rural setting in Marshall County, Tennessee, near the village of Mooresville.

The Bear Creek congregation was organized in 1814. Its founder, the Reverend Samuel King, was one of the founders of the Cumberland Presbyterian denomination.

The church building is a brick structure in a vernacular Victorian design. It was built in 1897 and dedicated in 1898. It was added to the National Register of Historic Places in 1985.
The church is privately owned and has been vandalized several times. After this last vandalism the church lost several of its historic windows. Alarms are being installed. It is not open to the public. Vandals will be prosecuted to the fullest extent of the law.

References

Presbyterian churches in Tennessee
Churches on the National Register of Historic Places in Tennessee
Churches completed in 1897
Religious organizations established in 1814
19th-century Presbyterian church buildings in the United States
Buildings and structures in Marshall County, Tennessee
Cumberland Presbyterian Church
National Register of Historic Places in Marshall County, Tennessee